Jeni (J.A.) Mawter (born 1959) is an Australian children's author who has published over twenty books, including the best-selling series, the So series. She has published fiction and non-fiction, poetry and verse narrative for children and young adults. Her books have ranged from picture books, to chapter books, short story collections to young adult novels. Her novel, Team Dream, was published in 2005.

Biography 
Mawter was born in Sydney to parents, Nola and Garry Braude. She has a sister, Debbi and a brother, Michael. Mawter attended Willoughby Infants', Willoughby Primary and Willoughby Girls' High School where she was School Captain in 1977. She completed a Bachelor of Applied Science in Speech Pathology at Cumberland College (now Sydney University), graduating in 1980 and winning the Private Speech Pathology Association Prize. Mawter worked as a speech pathologist for many years at the Royal Prince Alfred, Royal North Shore and Eversleigh Hospitals, working with neurology, neurosurgery, and head and neck patients. For two years she ran the Speech Pathology Student Unit at Royal North Shore Hospital (1987–88) then worked for several years as a Case Manager for the Commonwealth Rehabilitation Service (1993-1996).

Mawter completed a Diploma of Book Editing from Macleay College (1997) and a Master of Arts in Children's Literature from Macquarie University (1998). Since then, she has taught creative writing at Macquarie University, the NSW Writer's Centre and is a frequent speaker at schools and literary festivals throughout Australia. Mawter has run creative writing workshops for students from 5 years to 91 years.

Mawter is married to David Mawter and they have three children: Hugh, Shevaughn and Tullia.

Published works

Freewheelers series
 Extreme! (2008)
 Launched! (2007)
 Unleashed! (2006)

Critical Thinking, Humour and Text
 Critical Thinking: Humour and Text Ages 5 - 8 (2007)
 Critical Thinking: Humour and Text Ages 8 – 10 (2007)
 Critical Thinking: Humour and Text Ages 10+ (2007)

Junior fiction
 Team Dream (2005)
 Turkey Pox (2005)
 There's a Sun Fairy in Our Garden (2001)
 Go, the Mobile! (2001)
 The Most Unusual Pet (2001)
 Maisie's Race (2000)

Other published works

Audio
 So Sick! (2006)
 So Feral! (2005)
 So Festy! (2005)
 So Gross! (2004)

Classroom focus
 Human Body (2008)
 The Changing face of Xmas in Australia (2004)
 The Snowy Mountains Scheme (2003)
 Food (2002)
 Feelings (2002)
 Homes and Families (2002)
 Special Days (2001)
 Natural Disasters (2001)

Anthologies
 "Excuse Me" in Short, Black Dog Books (2008)
 "Getting into the nitty gritty" in Writing {better} stories, Primary English Teaching Association (2006)
 "Pear Legs, Hello" in Alive and Winking, John Wiley & Sons Publishers (2006)
 "Slow Swimming" and The Kiss published in Alive and Kicking, John Wiley & Sons Publishers (2005)

Multimedia
 Along with Sue Murray, co-wrote the scripts for the interactive display The Magic Garden: MBF Foundation Healthy Kids Unit for The Powerhouse Museum, Sydney. (2008)

Articles
 Humour, Literacy and Literature, Teacher & Librarian, ASLA NSW (March 2006)
 Thinking Skills, Humorous Texts and Literacy, ACCESS, ASLA National (2006)
 Mentorship Newswrite, NSW Writer's Centre (2005)
 Writing Humour: Why Gross Works for Kids, Paper given at the Sydney Writers' Festival (2005)
 Tell Me a Story, Classroom Magazine, Scholastic Australia, Issue 5 (2000)
 The Brain-Injured Child in the Classroom, Classroom Magazine, Scholastic Australia, Issue 6 (1999)

Awards 
Unleashed! shortlisted for the West Australian Young Readers' Book Awards in 2009

See also

External links
 Jeni Mawter's official homepage
 West Australian Young Readers' Book Awards

1959 births
Living people
Australian children's writers
Australian non-fiction writers
Australian women children's writers